The 2022 Pro Golf Tour was the 26th season of the Pro Golf Tour (formerly the EPD Tour), one of four third-tier tours recognised by the European Tour.

Schedule
The following table lists official events during the 2022 season.

Order of Merit
The Order of Merit was based on prize money won during the season, calculated using a points-based system. The top five players on the tour (not otherwise exempt) earned status to play on the 2023 Challenge Tour.

Notes

References

Pro Golf Tour